The green-billed malkoha (Phaenicophaeus tristis) is a species of non-parasitic cuckoo found throughout Indian Subcontinent and Southeast Asia. The birds are waxy bluish black with a long graduated tail with white tips to the tail feathers. The bill is prominent and curved. These birds are found in dry scrub and thin forests.

Description
Green-billed malkoha is about 50–60 cm centimetres long and weighs 100–128 g. It often has a clear white boarder to the red face patch salty grey on the face and neck. Adult green-billed malkoha has dark grey with green gloss above, oily green wings.

Distribution and habitat
Its breeding habitat is Primary forest, second growth, dense thickets, scrub, cultivated areas, rubber plantations across south Asia east from Nepal, India, and Sri Lanka to the Southeast Asia.

Gallery

References

green-billed malkoha
Birds of Bangladesh
Birds of Eastern Himalaya
Birds of Nepal
Birds of India
Birds of Southeast Asia
green-billed malkoha
Taxa named by René Lesson
Articles containing video clips